The Pixel 5 is an Android smartphone designed, developed, and marketed by Google as part of the Google Pixel product line. It serves as the successor to the Pixel 4. It was officially announced on September 30, 2020 at the "Launch Night In" event alongside the Pixel 4a (5G) and released in the United States on October 29. It is the first flagship smartphone in the Pixel lineup not to feature an XL version. On October 19, 2021, it was succeeded by the Pixel 6 and Pixel 6 Pro.

Specifications

Design and hardware 
The Pixel 5 is constructed using a "100% recycled aluminum enclosure" and Gorilla Glass 6 for the screen. The device is available in Just Black and Sorta Sage colors, both of which have a matte finish. The housing has a thick coating of plastic, while the power button is anodized with a metallic finish. The bottom of the device has a USB-C connector which is used for charging and audio output. It has stereo speakers, one of which is an under display unit with the other speaker located to the right of the USB-C port. The back houses a capacitive fingerprint reader, which was removed on the Pixel 4.

The Pixel 5 uses the mid-range Qualcomm Snapdragon 765G system-on-chip (consisting of eight Kryo 475 cores, an Adreno 620 GPU and a Hexagon 696 DSP), with 8 GB of LPDDR4X RAM and 128 GB of non-expandable UFS 2.1 internal storage. The Snapdragon 765G allows for standard 5G connectivity; both "sub-6" and millimeter-wave (mmWave) networks are supported.

The Pixel 5 has a 4080mAh battery, a significant increase over its predecessor's 2800 mAh battery. It is capable of fast-charging at up to 18 W, and supports Qi wireless charging as well as reverse wireless charging. This is enabled through a cutout in the back panel for the wireless charging coil, covered by bio-resin. It retains the water protection rating of IP68 under IEC standard 60529. The Pixel 4's Motion Sense capabilities and facial recognition have been omitted, as well as Active Edge and Pixel Neural Core.

The Pixel 5 features a 6-inch (152mm) 1080p OLED display with HDR10+ support, that operates at a refresh rate of up to 90 Hz; it dynamically adjusts depending on content to preserve battery life. The display has a 19.5:9 aspect ratio, and adopts a design aesthetic similar to the Pixel 4a, with slim uniform bezels and a circular cutout in the upper left hand corner for the front-facing camera.

The Pixel 5 includes dual rear-facing cameras located within a raised square module. While the wide camera is unchanged, it includes an ultrawide lens replacing the Pixel 4's telephoto lens. The wide 28 mm 77° f/1.7 lens has the Sony Exmor IMX363 12.2-megapixel sensor, while the ultrawide 107° f/2.2 lens has a 16-megapixel sensor; both sensors are shared with the Pixel 4a (5G). The front-facing camera uses an 8-megapixel sensor. Along with the Pixel 4a (5G), it is the first Pixel phone capable of recording 4K video at 60 fps, as previous Pixel phones were limited to 30 fps. Although it lacks Pixel Neural Core, Pixel Visual Core has been reworked to support Live HDR+ and Dual Exposure features present on the Pixel 4. Additional software improvements include a new Portrait Light mode, Portrait Mode for Night Sight, a Cinematic Pan setting and HDR+ with exposure bracketing.

Software 
The Pixel 5 shipped with Android 11 and version 8.0 of the Google Camera app at launch, with features such as Call Screen and a Personal Safety app. A new feature introduced concurrently on the Pixel 4a (5G) is Extreme Battery Saver, which stops background app processing and only lets essential apps run. It will be available on older Pixel models as a part of a future software update. It is expected to receive 3 years of major OS upgrades with support extending until 2023.

The Pixel 5 is the last Pixel phone to ship with unlimited storage in high definition on Google Photos, with subsequent phones (beginning with the Pixel 5a and Pixel 6 series) no longer including this offer.

References

External links
 
 Launch Night In

Android (operating system) devices
Discontinued flagship smartphones
Foxconn
Google hardware
Google Pixel
Mobile phones introduced in 2020
Mobile phones with 4K video recording
Mobile phones with multiple rear cameras